The 1914 Wisconsin Badgers football team represented the University of Wisconsin as a member of the Western Conference during the 1914 college football season. Led by third-year head coach William Juneau, the Badgers compiled an overall record of 4–2–1 with a mark of 2–2–1 in conference play, tying for fourth place in the Western Conference. The team's captain was Ray Keeler.

Schedule

References

Wisconsin
Wisconsin Badgers football seasons
Wisconsin Badgers football